Loughborough is a market town and unparished area in the Charnwood borough of Leicestershire, England, the seat of Charnwood Borough Council and Loughborough University. At the 2011 census the town's built-up area had a population of 59,932, the second largest in the county after Leicester. It is close to the Nottinghamshire border and short distances from Leicester, Nottingham, East Midlands Airport and Derby. It has the world's largest bell foundry, John Taylor Bellfounders, which made bells for the Carillon War Memorial, a landmark in the Queens Park in the town, of Great Paul for St Paul's Cathedral, and for York Minster.

History

Medieval
The earliest reference to Loughborough occurs in the Domesday Book of 1086, which calls it Lucteburne. It appears as Lucteburga in a charter from the reign of Henry II, and as Luchteburc in the Pipe Rolls of 1186. The name is of Old English origin and means "Luhhede's burh or fortified place".

Industrialisation
The first sign of industrialisation in the district came in the early 19th century, when John Heathcoat, an inventor from Derbyshire, patented in 1809 an improvement to the warp loom, known as the twisted lace machine, which allowed mitts with a lace-like appearance to be made.

Heathcoat, in partnership with the Nottingham manufacturer Charles Lacy, moved his business from there to the village of Hathern, outside Loughborough. The product of this "Loughborough machine" came to be known as English net or bobbinet. However, the factory was attacked in 1816 by Luddites thought to be in the pay of Nottingham competitors and 55 frames were destroyed. This prompted Heathcoat to move his business to a disused woollen mill in Tiverton, Devon.

In 1888 a charter of incorporation was obtained, allowing a mayor and corporation to be elected. The population increased from 11,000 to 25,000 in the following ten years.

Among the factories established were Robert Taylor's bell foundry John Taylor & Co and the Falcon works, which produced steam locomotives, then motor cars, before it was taken over by Brush Electrical Machines. In 1897, Herbert Morris set up a factory in the Empress Works in Moor Lane which become one of the foremost crane manufacturers by the mid-20th century.

There was also strong municipal investment: a new sewage works in 1895, then a waterworks in Blackbrook and a power station in Bridge Street in 1899. The corporation took over the Loughborough Gas Company in 1900.

Tourism
In 1841, Loughborough was the destination for the first package tour, organised by Thomas Cook for a temperance group from Leicester.

Modern history
As Loughborough grew in the 20th century, it gained new suburbs. Thorpe Acre in the north-west of Loughborough was a hamlet of about twenty dwellings until the mid-20th century. Several earlier survivors include a 19th-century church – All Saints Church, Thorpe Acre with Dishley, built in 1845 and extended in 1968 – and a hostelry, The Plough Inn. The population is counted into the Loughborough–Garendon Ward of Charnwood Council. Many roads there are named after poets. After World War II, some of Thorpe Acre developed further, mainly in the 1950s for employees of Brush Engineering Works, with 100 dwellings built of no-fines concrete. In the 1960s and early 1970s, Thorpe Acre gained a new estate that subsumed the old village. Two of Loughborough's secondary schools, Charnwood College and De Lisle College, lie on its bounds, as does Garendon Park, a large deer park from the 18th century. The original Dishley, off Derby Road, was heavily developed along with Thorpe Acre in the 1970s. Dishley Church in Derby Road is now in ruins. The agriculturalist Robert Bakewell (1726–1795) is buried there.

Shelthorpe and surrounding area are new suburbs in the south of Loughborough. Work on the original Shelthorpe started in 1929, but was halted by World War II and resumed in 1946. The centre of Shelthorpe has a wide variety of shops, including a Tesco Extra, which is probably the largest supermarket in Loughborough.

The Hazel Road and Fairmeadows Way estates to the west of Shelthorpe and the south of the university date from the 1970s. They stretch from Holywell Drive to Hazel Road. Rainbows Hospice, a children's hospice, and the secondary Woodbrook Vale School are on the edge of the suburb. They were followed by the Haddon Way estates to the south of the estates, and then by Grange Park, just south of Shelthorpe and north-west of the hamlet of Woodthorpe, whose construction began in 2006 after completion of Terry Yardley Way to One Ash Roundabout, the last phase of Loughborough's A6004 ring road.

A planning application to build 30 new homes by William Davis Homes came under criticism in 2018 from residents saying that they had been promised public amenities like shops and a place of worship, but were living on "a construction site"; the site was originally intended to have shops, a church, community centre and health centre built on it. Despite the criticism, Charnwood Borough Council approved the plans. Most of the housing schemes in the area have been completed; however, one further development of 33 homes, called Willowbrook, has commenced, and plans for another of 120 homes to the east of Woodthorpe have been registered.

Persimmon Homes and William Davis Homes unveiled plans in 2013 for 3,200 new houses on Garendon Park as the West of Loughborough Sustainable Urban Extension. These were approved in 2018. A new roundabout is under construction on the A512; this will connect the new development to the north with a new Science and Enterprise Park to the south. The A512 is being widened between junction 23 of the M1 and Snells Nook Lane. After hosting two successful vegan markets in 2022, Charnwood Borough Council initiated three vegan markets to be held in Market Place in March, May, and October 2023.

Transport

Rail

Loughborough station is a mainline station serving the town. In 2012, Network Rail redeveloped the station increasing the length of the platforms and improving access; concurrently, the local council made improvements to the surrounding area. East Midlands Railway is the primary operator providing services on the Midland Main Line south to Leicester, Market Harborough, Kettering and London St Pancras stations and north to Nottingham, Lincoln, Derby and Sheffield stations. The link to London is twice-hourly and provides a link to Europe via Eurostar. Leicester and Derby stations allow transfers to CrossCountry trains running between the north-east of Scotland and the south-west of England.

There were at one time three railway routes to the town: the still-operating Midland Main Line, the Great Central Railway that closed as a result of the Beeching cuts and a branch line from Nuneaton that was part of the London & North Western Railway. Loughborough Central railway station served the Great Central Railway. It was opened on 15 March 1899 and closed in 1969 but re-opened in March 1974 as part of the Great Central heritage railway. The railway is split into two sections north and south of Loughborough. Loughborough Central station is the northern terminus of the southern section of the railway and services run daily. As of 2017, there were plans to fill the gap and link the two halves of the railway again. Thus, a new bridge was installed over the Midland Main Line, the A60 and the Grand Union Canal. Work is now progressing on restoring another bridge over parking lot of an industrial estate. 

Brush Traction, a manufacturer of railway locomotives, is also located in the town, adjacent to the Midland railway station.

Roads
Loughborough sits at the crossroads of three main roads, two of which begin in Loughborough itself. The A6 main road begins at Luton before running north through places such as Bedford, Leicester, Loughborough, Derby and Manchester, and ending at Carlisle.

The A60 begins in Loughborough and goes north to Nottingham, Mansfield and Worksop. The A512 begins in Loughborough and runs west towards the M1, Shepshed and Ashby-de-la-Zouch, while the A6004, which was originally proposed as a bypass for Loughborough, runs from just south of the town around the western and northern suburbs of Loughborough, ending near the railway station at the A60.

Other signed routes are the B589, running between the A6 and the A60, and the B5350, running between the A6 and the A6004.

The M1's Junction 23 lies just to the west of Loughborough. The north of the town can be accessed from Junction 24, travelling through Kegworth and Hathern on the A6 road and the south-west of the town from Junction 22, via Copt Oak and the small hamlet of Nanpantan.

Buses
Buses in and around Loughborough are operated by Arriva Midlands, Kinchbus, Midland Classic, Centrebus, Nottingham City Transport and trentbarton.

Buses around Loughborough town centre depart from on-street stops on either Baxter Gate, Swan Street, High Street or Lemyngton Street, until around 2001 bus services were operated from a bus station on Swan Street/The Rushes within the town centre but this was demolished as part of the town centre regeneration with The Rushes Shopping Centre being built on the site.

Waterways
The River Soar passes by to the east of the town. Navigation from Loughborough north towards the Trent was achieved in 1778 by the Loughborough Navigation, which terminates at Loughborough Wharf between Derby Road and Bridge Street. Subsequently, the Leicester navigation was constructed, connecting to the Loughborough Navigation at Chain Bridge and to the River Soar south of the town. Both form part of the Grand Union Canal.

The now derelict Charnwood Forest Canal once linked Nanpantan (on the west side of Loughborough) with Thringstone, with goods being carried into Loughborough by a horse-drawn wagonway.

Economy

The centre of Loughborough's shopping area is the pedestrianised Market Place and Market Street, which maintain a number of original art deco buildings, such as the building that currently houses the town's Odeon cinema. A large outdoor market is held in the Market Place every Thursday and Saturday. There is a monthly farmers' market. The first mention of a market in Loughborough is in 1221. 

The Rushes shopping centre has also been built on the site of the former bus station and is occupied by national chains. The Rushes is linked to the town centre area by Churchgate and Churchgate Mews; the latter has independent shops.

A major new development, the Eastern Gateway, that developed the area around the railway station with a new road and new housing, was completed in 2013.

Pedestrianisation of the town centre was completed in November 2014. The scheme is intended to improve the economy within the town centre and reduce pollution from traffic congestion.

A new Cineworld cinema complex with several restaurants on Baxter Gate, on the site of the former General Hospital, was completed in 2016.

Press
Loughborough's local weekly newspaper is the Loughborough Echo. The town is also served by Leicestershire's daily newspaper, the Leicester Mercury.

Climate

Like most of the British Isles, Loughborough experiences a maritime climate with cool summers and mild winters. The nearest Met Office weather station is at Sutton Bonington in Nottinghamshire, located 5 miles due north of the town centre.

Sport
The town was once home to a professional football club, Loughborough FC, which played at the Athletic Ground and was a member of the Football League in the late 19th century. Loughborough Dynamo of the Northern Premier League Division One South East (Level 8 of the men's football pyramid), Loughborough University of the United Counties League Premier Division (Level 9 of the men's football pyramid) and women's team Loughborough Foxes of the FA Women's National League North (Level 3 of the women's football pyramid) are the most prominent football teams in the town currently.

Cricket is prominent, with the Old Contemptibles, Loughborough Town CC, Loughborough Outwoods CC, Loughborough Carillon CC, Loughborough Carillon Old Boys' CC, Loughborough University Staff CC, Loughborough Greenfields CC and Loughborough Lightning of the semi-professional Women's Cricket Super League representing various standards of cricket in the area. Loughborough Town has since 2000 been the most successful club in the Leicestershire and Rutland Cricket League. The university is home to the ECB National Cricket Academy, used by the England team as their primary training centre.

The town rugby union club, Loughborough RFC, play at Derby Road playing fields. The club was formed in 1891.
The University's 1st XV rugby team, the Loughborough Students RUFC, were promoted to the National One division in 2012, which is the 3rd tier of English rugby. 

Other sports teams include the Loughborough Aces (collegiate American football), Loughborough Lightning of the Netball Superleague and Loughborough Hawks, an amateur netball team. The town also has its own swimming club, Loughborough Town Swimming Club, which is based in the town and trains at local venues.

The tennis tournament Aegon Pro-Series Loughborough is held in Loughborough.

London Roar head coach and former swimmer Melanie Marshall resides in Loughborough and is the lead coach in the Loughborough National Swimming centre  where she trains multi-champion Adam Peaty.

Arts and heritage

Loughborough has five museums, the largest being the centrally located Charnwood Museum, which houses a range of exhibits reflecting the natural history, geology, industry and history of the area. Nearby in Queens Park is the Carillon and War Memorial, home to a small museum of military memorabilia from the First and Second World Wars. Loughborough Library is on Granby Street.

Also to be found in the town centre, near the fine medieval All Saints parish church, is the Old Rectory. Dating back to 1288 the remaining portion of the Great Hall has been restored and houses a small museum run by the Loughborough Archaeological and Historical Society.

Loughborough has for more than a century been the home of John Taylor & Co, bell founders. The firm's Bellfoundry Museum on two floors tells the story of bell-making over the centuries. The recording of the tolling bell at the beginning of "Hells Bells", the first track on AC/DC's 1980 album Back in Black was made on a quarter-weight near replica of the Denison bell in the Carillon war memorial.

There is a museum at the former Great Central Railway station, illustrating the history of the railway from its earliest days up to its present state as a double-track preserved heritage railway.

Although Loughborough has no dedicated art gallery, fine sculpture can be found in the town's environs, including those installed from a local artist in commemoration of the First World War Centenary outside Charnwood Museum, and The Sockman, a bronze statue marking Loughborough's association with the hosiery industry. This can be found in the Market Place near Loughborough Town Hall, which itself contains a number of art works. It is also the venue for concerts, exhibitions, musicals, comedy shows and a Christmas pantomime. Groups make use of the town hall for their shows.

Events are also organised by Charnwood Arts, a voluntarily managed and professionally staffed body offering a year-round programme of professional performances across the borough. They include the Picnic In the Park, inaugurated in 1980, which is held in Queens Park in May. Streets Alive, jointly organised by Charnwood Arts and Charnwood Borough Council, takes place at a similar time of year.

The Loughborough Canal Festival, which ran from 1997 to 2014, was an annual event in May centred on Chain Bridge.

Great Central Railway is a heritage railway based at Loughborough Central Station, which is south of the town centre. It is operated largely by volunteers. Trains run every weekend of the year and on bank holidays, as well as daily during the summer.

Every November, a street fair takes over the centre of the town, closing some roads. The fair runs from Wednesday afternoon until Saturday night and offers rides, amusement arcades, food stands and games. Fairs have been held in Loughborough for centuries, the first official Charter being granted to the Lord of the Manor, Hugh le Despencer, in 1221 by King Henry III. The Fair was then held on St. Peter’s Day.

The town has an Odeon cinema designed by Archibald Hurley Robinson in an Art Deco style. There are six screens. The cinema was built in 1914 as the Empire and was remodelled in 1936 by Hurley Robinson as the New Empire Cinema. Over the years it has been named the Palm Court and Ballroom, Empire, Essoldo, Classic, Curzon and Reel. The site of the former Loughborough General Hospital, demolished in 2012, has been taken by a Cineworld cinema with eight screens, which opened in 2016.

Education

Schools

Tertiary education

Loughborough University

In 2004, Loughborough University was ranked 9th among British universities by The Times''' Good University Guide. In 2006 Loughborough was ranked 6th. In 2007 The Guardian rated the university 8th, and 10th of 117 institutions by The Guardian League Tables 2009 (published online 1 June 2008 for the 2009–2010 academic year. The university stands fifth in some rankings, behind Oxbridge and the London universities. It has the largest sports scholarship in the UK. More than 250 international athletes study and train there. In 2008 it was named Sunday Times University of the Year.

Loughborough College

Loughborough College is the second biggest education establishment in Loughborough, after the University. It offers further education and vocational courses. It was established in 1909, and has over 12,000 full and part-time students.

RNIB College, Loughborough

RNIB College, Loughborough, caters for those over 16 with a wide range of disabilities, seeking access to education, employment and independent living.

Uniformed youth organisations
Loughborough has a variety of uniformed youth organisations, with several Scout and Girl Guide units, Girls' and Boys' Brigades, units from the cadet forces (Air Training Corps, Army Cadet Force, Sea Cadet Corps, and Combined Cadet Force at Loughborough Grammar School), a St John Ambulance Cadet unit, and a cadet programme run by the local Fire and Rescue Service. Since November 2015, Loughborough has also had a Volunteer Police Cadet unit based at Loughborough College.

Notable people
Loughborough was the birthplace of the poet and Royalist John Cleveland (1613–1658).

John Paget (1808–1892), an English agriculturist and writer on Hungary, was born here.

The bellfounder John William Taylor (1827-1906) of John Taylor & Co lived and died here. The chemist Arthur Donald Walsh FRS (8 August 1916 – 23 April 1977) was born in Loughborough and attended Loughborough Grammar School. The engineer, physicist and author Charles Denis Mee was born here in 1927. 

Other Loughborough natives include Albert Francis Cross, the journalist, author, poet and playwright who was born on Moor Lane on 9 May 1863, the two time Laurence Olivier Award nominated stage actress Nicola Hughes and Coronation Street's Roy Cropper actor David Neilson, and the notorious rock star of the mid-1960s, Viv Prince of the Pretty Things. Bobsleigher and Paratrooper Dean Ward, who won a bronze medal at the 1998 Winter Olympics was born in the town.
Felix Buxton of Basement Jaxx was a pupil at Loughborough Grammar School and son of the one-time vicar of nearby Woodhouse Eaves and Ibstock. The Dundee-born comedian, TV presenter and entertainer Danny Wallace attended Holywell County Primary School. Second World War fighter ace Johnnie Johnson attended Loughborough Grammar School. The high jumper Ben Challenger, son of Showaddywaddy drummer Romeo Challenger, is from Loughborough. The popular Muslim and Bangladeshi presenter Rizwan Hussain was brought up there. The cultural thinker Mark Fisher, writer of Capitalist Realism: Is There No Alternative'' (2009), grew up in the town.

Notable sporting graduates of Loughborough University include Sir Clive Woodward, Sebastian Coe, Paula Radcliffe, David Moorcroft, Tanni Grey-Thompson, Monty Panesar, Steve Backley, Jack Kirwan and Lawrie Sanchez.

Professional footballers, Liam Moore and Hamza Choudhury were both born in the town and have gone on to play in the Premier League with nearby Leicester City. Fred Ainsworth was also born here. England Rugby union captain Phil de Glanville was born in the town. 

Other known people: Sue Campbell, Baroness Campbell of Loughborough current Head of FA Women's football, Nicky Morgan, Baroness Morgan of Cotes.

Twin towns

Loughborough is twinned with:
Épinal, Vosges, France
Gembloux, Namur, Belgium
Schwäbisch Hall, Baden-Württemberg, Germany
Zamość, Lublin Voivodeship, Poland
Loughborough has a friendship link with Bhavnagar, Gujarat, India

Closest settlements
This list is of the closest cities and towns to the town of Loughborough. It does not include villages.

References

Further reading

External links

Loughborough Town Hall
Loughborough Carillon

 
Towns in Leicestershire
Unparished areas in Leicestershire
Former civil parishes in Leicestershire
Borough of Charnwood